Harding Lake is a lake in the Fairbanks North Star Borough in Interior Alaska. It is named for President Warren G. Harding, who visited Alaska just before he died. Prior to that it was known as Salchaket Lake  Access to the lake is via the Richardson Highway

Fish species
The lake contains a wide variety of native and stocked fish, including Arctic char, burbot, Arctic grayling, and northern pike, as well as several salmon and trout species. Anglers are advised to check current regulations with the Alaska Department of Fish and Game before fishing.

Recreation Area
The lake is home to the Harding Lake State Recreation Area a  park which features a large campground, boat launch, and facilities for sports and outdoor games. This is one of the oldest units in the Alaska State Park system, having been founded in 1967, before the formal state park network was even in place.

References

Lakes of Alaska